Ahmadi (also Romanized as Aḩmadī) is a village in Buchir Rural District, in the Central District of Parsian County, Hormozgan Province, Iran. At the 2006 census, its population was 142, in 33 families.

References 

Populated places in Parsian County